List of MPs elected in the 1713 British general election

This is a list of the 558 MPs or Members of Parliament elected to the 314 constituencies of the Parliament of Great Britain in 1713, the 4th Parliament of Great Britain and their replacements returned at subsequent by-elections, arranged by constituency.

Elections took place in 22 August – 12 November 1713



By-elections 
List of Great Britain by-elections (1707–15)

See also
1713 British general election
4th Parliament of Great Britain
List of parliaments of Great Britain
Unreformed House of Commons

References

 The House of Commons 1690–1715, eds. D. Hayton, E. Cruickshanks, and S. Handley (2002)

External links
 History of Parliament: Members 1690–1715
 History of Parliament: Constituencies 1690–1715

1713
1713
1713 in Great Britain
Lists of Members of the Parliament of Great Britain